Akpotoro is one of the five communities that made up of Obimo in Nsukka local government area of Enugu state in Nigeria.

Composition

Akpotoro is made up of two sub-communities:

Uwani
Uwani has four villages:
Obeke
Umu Ogbuagu
Umu Okparaenu  
Ajuona.

Isi Enu
Isi Enu has three villages:
Umu Eze
Ama Ogene 
Uwa Enu

Akpotoro shares common boundary with Lejja towards Agu-Lagos area as its fondly called due to its distance from the main community.

School

The schools that serve the community include, community secondary school Akpotoro Obimo and Udoka primary school both located in the centre of the community together with S.S Peter and Paul catholic church Akpotoro, a station of St. Raphael's parish Obimo, under the diocese of St. Theresa cathedral, Nsukka dioces.

Market
Akpotoro has a rotational market EKE that operates only on Eke one of the four market days according to the Igbo weekly calendar.

Populated places in Enugu State